Grau Roig is a sector of the Grandvalira ski resort in Andorra, located in the parish of Encamp. It includes alpine skiing and cross-country skiing tracks. It is the only sector in Grandvalira which does not have a populated settlement. The nearest major settlement is Pas de la Casa, to the east on the border with France.

References

External links

Populated places in Andorra
Encamp
Ski areas and resorts in Andorra